Wykroty  is a settlement in the administrative district of Gmina Postomino, within Sławno County, West Pomeranian Voivodeship, in north-western Poland.

For the history of the region, see History of Pomerania.

Notable residents
 Werner Lorenz (1891–1974), SS-officer

References

Wykroty